Vladimir Kirillovich Molchanov (born October 7, 1950, Moscow, USSR) is a Soviet and Russian TV and radio host, speaker and journalist. He was a writer and host of the TV program Before and after midnight in the late 1980s - early 1990s on Soviet television. He is a member of the Russian Television Academy since 1994, and head of the studio of the Faculty of Journalism at Moscow Institute of Television and Radio Broadcasting Ostankino.

Family and personal life 
Molchanovs parents were his father, composer Kirill Molchanov, and his mother, actress Marina Dmitrieva-Pastukhova. His godmother was Olga Knipper. His half-sister Anna Dmitrieva is a sports commentator. He is married to Cuban Consuelo Segura, a director. He has a daughter, Anna and grandson, Dmitry.

External links
 Интервью Владимира Молчанова на радио «Эхо Москвы»
 Интервью Владимира Молчанова газете «Европеец» (Голландия)
 Юбилейное интервью Владимира Молчанова газете «Вести» (Германия)

1950 births
Living people
Soviet journalists
Russian male journalists
Russian journalists
Recipients of the Order of Honour (Russia)
Russian television presenters
Radio and television announcers
Moscow State University alumni